Enolmis tunisiae is a moth of the family Scythrididae. It was described by Bengt Å. Bengtsson in 2005. It is found in Tunisia.

References

Scythrididae
Moths described in 2005